Communities In Schools (CIS) is a non-profit organization based in America.  CIS works within public and charter schools to help at-risk students. CIS works with schools in 25 states and the District of Columbia. In In February 2020, CIS announced that VIA Metropolitan Transit Board of Trustees chairman and former San Antonio City Councilman Rey Saldaña would become the new president and CEO.

National evaluation

Overview
In 2005, CIS  was awarded a fourteen million dollar contract to evaluate its national network and programming. ICF International, was contracted to conduct the five-year longitudinal study titled, The National Evaluation of Communities In Schools. The study was designed to determine the effectiveness of the CIS model. Based on an in-depth analysis of 1,776 schools served by CIS, a comparative analysis of outcomes from more than 1,200 CIS served and non-CIS served comparison schools, and comparative analysis of CIS served students and non-CIS served students alongside in-depth case studies of students. The study was being conducted in three phases.

Results
Among dropout prevention programs, using scientifically based evidence, the CIS model is one of a very few in the United States proven to keep students in school and is the only dropout prevention program in the nation with scientifically based evidence to prove that it can increase graduation rates. B
https://www.ntcc.edu/cis
When implemented with high fidelity, the CIS model results in a higher percentage of students reaching proficiency in fourth- and eighth-grade reading and math.
Effective implementation of the CIS model correlates more strongly with positive school-level outcomes (i.e., dropout and graduation rates, achievement, etc.) than does the uncoordinated provision of service alone, resulting in notable improvements of school level outcomes in the context of the CIS model.

References

Further reading
Center for Social Organization of Schools at Johns Hopkins University
Milliken, Bill. The Last Dropout, Stop the Epidemic, New York City: Hay House Inc., 2007.
Freiberg, H.J. (1998). Measuring school climate: Let me count the ways. Educational Leadership, 56 (1). 22-26.

External links

Alternative schools
Educational charities based in the United States
Charities based in Virginia
1977 establishments in the United States
Organizations established in 1977